Osmia foxi is a species of mason bees in the family Megachilidae. It is found in New Mexico and southeastern Arizona in the United States and in Sonora, Mexico.

The female Osmia foxi are 9.5 mm to 10.5 mm total length, and the males are 8.5 mm to 10.5 mm. The body is a brilliant metallic green to blue-green, except yellow-green on the face.

References

Further reading

 
 
 
 
 

foxi
Insects described in 1901